Štefan Pipa (10 January 1950 – 25 September 2019) was a Slovak volleyball player. He competed at the 1972 Summer Olympics and the 1976 Summer Olympics.

References

External links
 

1950 births
2019 deaths
Slovak men's volleyball players
Olympic volleyball players of Czechoslovakia
Volleyball players at the 1972 Summer Olympics
Volleyball players at the 1976 Summer Olympics
Sportspeople from Bratislava